The Central Pennsylvania Transportation Authority (formerly York Adams Transportation Authority), doing business as rabbittransit, is the mass transit service of York and Adams counties in Pennsylvania and oversees the transportation needs of Columbia, Cumberland, Franklin, Montour, Northumberland, Perry, Snyder and Union counties. The agency currently operates 15 fixed routes within York County (12 in York and 3 in Hanover) and 4 routes in Adams County (all of which serve Gettysburg), express bus routes from Gettysburg to Harrisburg and from York to Harrisburg and Towson, Maryland (connecting to the Baltimore Light RailLink of the Baltimore area's Maryland Transit Administration).

The agency, which has an annual ridership of 1.7 million, also provides paratransit services to the disabled, and a shared ride service.

History 

 During the late 2000s, rabbittransit has benefited from high gas prices and has seen an increase in ridership. Ridership in particular has risen on express routes, including the one operating between York and Harrisburg.
 On February 2, 2009, rabbittransit introduced a new line providing six trips each weekday between York and Towson, Maryland with connection to the Baltimore Light RailLink at Timonium.
 On June 6, 2011, rabbittransit (in cooperation with the Adams County Transit Authority) began operating commuter service between Gettysburg and Harrisburg with a total of four round-trips daily.  The route is designated "15N".
 On July 1, 2016, rabbittransit (in cooperation with Union/Snyder County Commissioners) merged with Union/Snyder Transportation Alliance (USTA)

Renaming 
rabbittransit was formerly known as York County Transit Authority. The name was changed in 2000 in order to improve the agency's image.  The name is a play of "rapid transit", coincidentally echoing the same play-on-words that formed the basis of the cartoon, Rabbit Transit.

Merger with Capital Area Transit 
On December 22, 2020, it was announced that rabbittransit would merge with Capital Area Transit (CAT), which offers service in Dauphin and Cumberland counties, to form the Susquehanna Regional Transportation Authority. The merger was proposed in order for better service and to prevent CAT service cuts. The merged system will use the rabbittransit name. The CAT branding continues to be used on CAT buses, with a sticker underneath the CAT logo saying  "a service of rabbittransit."

Routes
rabbittransit currently operates the following routes:

See also
Capital Area Transit (Harrisburg)

External links
rabbittransit homepage

References

Bus transportation in Pennsylvania
Transportation in York County, Pennsylvania
Paratransit services in the United States